Below is a list of video games that center on World War II for their setting.

Adventure games 
Remembering Pearl Harbor (2016) (VR)
Paradise Lost (2021 video game) (2021) (Alternate history)

FMV games

Charles Games' FMV series 
Attentat 1942 (2017)
Svoboda 1945: Liberation (2021)

Point and click adventures 
Indiana Jones and the Last Crusade: The Graphic Adventure (1989)
Indiana Jones and the Fate of Atlantis (1992)
A Stroke of Fate: Operation Valkyrie (2009)
A Stroke of Fate: Operation Bunker (2009)

Action-adventures 
Castlevania: Portrait of Ruin (2006)
The Train: Escape to Normandy (1987) (Multi-genre)
Indiana Jones and the Last Crusade: The Action Game (1989)
Indiana Jones and the Last Crusade (NES) (1991)
Indiana Jones and the Fate of Atlantis: The Action Game (1992)
Indiana Jones' Greatest Adventures (1994)
Indiana Jones and the Emperor's Tomb (2003)
Indiana Jones and the Staff of Kings (2009)
Medic: Pacific War (2023) (Multi-genre)

Interactive fiction 
Trinity (1986)
Indiana Jones in Revenge of the Ancients (1987)

Interactive storytelling 
Also known as 'Choose-your-own story/adventure'.
Gerda: A Flame in Winter (2022)
Train to Sachsenhausen (2022) (Mobile)

First-person shooters

The Wolfenstein series 
Wolfenstein 3D (1992)
Spear of Destiny (A Wolfenstein 3D Graphics Adventure) (1992)
Spear of Destiny Mission 2: Return to Danger (1994)
Spear of Destiny Mission 3: Ultimate Challenge (1994)
Return to Castle Wolfenstein (2001)
Wolfenstein: Enemy Territory (2003)
Wolfenstein (2009)
Wolfenstein: The New Order (2014)
Wolfenstein: The Old Blood (2015)
Wolfenstein II: The New Colossus (2017)

The Medal of Honor series 
Medal of Honor (1999)
Medal of Honor: Underground (2000)
Medal of Honor: Allied Assault (2002)
Medal of Honor: Allied Assault: Spearhead (expansion pack)
Medal of Honor: Allied Assault: Breakthrough (expansion pack)
Medal of Honor: Frontline (2002)
Medal of Honor: Infiltrator (2003)
Medal of Honor: Rising Sun (2003)
Medal of Honor: Pacific Assault (2004)
Medal of Honor: European Assault (2005)
Medal of Honor: Heroes (2006)
Medal of Honor: Vanguard (2007)
Medal of Honor: Airborne (2007)
Medal of Honor: Heroes 2 (2007)
Medal of Honor: Above and Beyond (2020)

The Battlefield series 
Battlefield 1942 (2002)
Battlefield: 1942: The Road to Rome (2003 expansion pack)
Battlefield: 1942: Secret Weapons of WWII (2003 expansion pack)
Battlefield Vietnam World War II Mod (2005)
Forgotten Hope (Mod for BF 1942) (2006)
Forgotten Hope 2 (Mod for BF 2) (2007)
Battlefield Heroes (2009)
Battlefield 1943 (2009)
Battlefield V (2018)

The Call of Duty series 
Call of Duty (2003)
Call of Duty: United Offensive (2004) (expansion pack)
Call of Duty: Finest Hour (2004)
Call of Duty 2 (2005)
Call of Duty 2: Big Red One (2005)
Call of Duty 3 (2006)
Call of Duty: Roads to Victory (2007)
Call of Duty: World at War – Final Fronts (2008)
Call of Duty: World at War (Nintendo DS) (2008)
Call of Duty: World at War (2008)
Call of Duty: WWII (2017)
Call of Duty: Vanguard (2021)

City Interactive's Battlestrike series and other games 
Including their other budget WWII FPS games:
World War II Sniper: Call To Victory (aka. Battlestrike: Call to Victory) (2004)
World War II Combat: Road to Berlin (aka. Battlestrike: Secret Weapons of WWII) (2006)
World War II Combat: Iwo Jima (aka. The Heat of War) (2006)
Wolfschanze 1944: The Final Attempt (2006)
Battlestrike: Force of Resistance (aka. Mortyr 3) (2007)
Operation Thunderstorm (aka. Mortyr: Operation Thunderstorm) (2008)
Royal Marines Commando (2008)
Battlestrike: Shadow of Stalingrad (2009)
Wolfschanze II (2011)

Corvostudio's Easy Red series 
Easy Red (2017)
A Front Too Far: Normandy (2018) (Multi-genre)
Easy Red 2 (2020)
Easy Red 2: Stalingrad (2022) (Expansion)

Warlines Studios' WWII Operations series 
Series titles are free to download.
OSS: WW2 Operations (2017)
WWII Operations: Desert Front (2020)
WWII Operations: Lions on The Desert Front (2022) (Spin-off of Desert Front)
The Quick Run - WWII Operations (2021)

Polygon Art's budget WW2 FPS series 
Beyond Enemy Lines' - Remastered Edition (2021)
United Assault - Normandy '44 (2021)
United Assault - Battle of the Bulge (2022)

Other first person shooters 
World War II GI (1999)
Mortyr (1999)
Elite Forces: WWII – Normandy (2001)
Elite Forces: WWII – Iwo Jima (2001)
Elite Forces: D-Day: Normandy (2002)
Beyond Normandy: Assignment Berlin (2003)
Airborne Hero: D–Day Frontline 1944 (2004)
Mortyr 2 (2004)
Ardennes Offensive (2004)
WWII: Soldier (aka. S.O.E.: Operation Avalanche) (2005)
Commandos: Strike Force (2006) (Multi-genre)
The Outfit (2006)
ÜberSoldier (2006)
History Channel's ShootOut! The Game (2006)
The History Channel: Battle for the Pacific (2007)
Hour of Victory (2007)
ÜberSoldier II (aka. Crimes of War) (2008)
Turning Point: Fall of Liberty (2008)
Operation Wolfsburg (2010)
Dino D-Day (2011)
Heroes and Generals (2012)
Enemy Front (2014)
Day of Infamy (video game) (2017)
Fog of War (2018)
Raid: World War II (2017)
BattleRush (2018)
BattleRush 2 (2019)
Battalion 1944 (2019)
Brass Brigade (2019) (Multi-genre)
Days of War (2020)
End of War 1945 (2020)
Land of War: The Beginning (2021)
WW2: Bunker Simulator (2022)

Tactical shooters

The Hidden & Dangerous series 
 Hidden and Dangerous (1999)
Hidden & Dangerous: Devil's Bridge (expansion pack) (2000)
Hidden & Dangerous Deluxe (improved Gold Edition with mission editor) (2002)
 Hidden and Dangerous 2 (2003)
Hidden and Dangerous 2: Sabre Squadron (expansion pack) (2004)

The Deadly Dozen series 
Deadly Dozen (2001)
Deadly Dozen: Pacific Theater (2002)
Deadly Dozen Reloaded (2022)

The Day of Defeat series 
Day of Defeat (2003)
Day of Defeat: Source (2005)

The Red Orchestra series 
Red Orchestra: Combined Arms Mod (2003-4)
Red Orchestra: Ostfront 41-45 (2006)
Mare Nostrum (Mod) (2008)
Darkest Hour: Europe '44-'45 (Mod) (2008)
Red Orchestra 2: Heroes of Stalingrad (2011)
Rising Storm expansion (2013)

The Brothers in Arms series 
Brothers in Arms: Road to Hill 30 (2005)
Brothers in Arms: Earned in Blood (2005)
Brothers in Arms: D-Day (2006)
Brothers in Arms DS (2007)
Brothers in Arms: Hell's Highway (2008)
Brothers in Arms: Double Time (2008)

The Sniper Elite series 
Sniper Elite (2005)
Sniper Elite V2 (2012)
Sniper Elite 3 (2014)
Sniper Elite 4 (2017)
Sniper Elite VR (2021)
Sniper Elite 5 (2022)

Other Tactical shooters 
Battle Europe (1993)
My Worst Day WW2 (2005)
Commandos: Strike Force (2006) (Multi-genre)
Sniper: Art of Victory (2008)
Day of Infamy (2017)
Warfare 1944 (2020)
Operation: Overlord (2023) (DLC for Operation: Harsh Doorstop (2023))

Rail shooters 
 Beach-Head (1983) (Multi-genre)
 The Train: Escape to Normandy (1987) (Multi-genre)
 Pearl Harbour (1988)
 Pearl Harbor: Attack! Attack! (2001)
 Pearl Harbor: Defend the Fleet (2001)
 B-17 Gunner: Air War Over Germany (2001)
 Operation Blockade (2002)
 Pacific Gunner (2002)
 WWII: Desert Rats (2002)
 Air Raid: This is not a Drill (aka. Air-Raid: This Is No Drill!) (2003)
 Battlestrike: Road to Berlin (2005)
 Battlestrike: The Siege (2005)
 Pearl Harbor Encounter (2012)
 Brave Witches VR: Operation Baba-Yaga – Counter Attack in the Snow (2017)
 Beach Invasion 1944 (2022)

Shoot 'em up games

The 194X series 
1942 (1984)
1943: The Battle of Midway (1987)
1943 Kai (1988)
1941: Counter Attack  (1990)
19XX: The War Against Destiny (1996)
1944: The Loop Master (2000)
1942: Joint Strike (2008)
1942: First Strike (2010)
Silent U-Boat: Atlantic Hunter (2020)

The Strikers 1945 series 
Strikers 1945 (1995)
Strikers 1945 II (1997)
Strikers 1945 Plus (1999)

The World Witches Series 

 Strike Witches: Silver Wings (2010)
 World Witches: United Front (2020)

Other shoot 'em up games 
Azur Lane (2017) (Mobile)
Aircraft Evolution (2018)
Until the Last Plane (2021) (Multi-genre)

Third-person shooters 
Uprising 44: The Silent Shadows (2012) (Multi-genre)
Foxhole (video game) (2017) (Multi-genre)
Brass Brigade (2019) (Multi-genre)

Arcade video games 
Beach-Head (1983) (Multi-genre)
Sky Aces 2 (2013) (mobile)

Survival games 
UBOAT (2019) (Multi-genre)
WW2: Bunker Simulator (2022)

Military simulations 
Also known as 'Milsims'.

The Iron Front mod group 
Iron Front Arma 3 All In One mod (2021) (Mod for Arma 3 (2013))
Recommended mod collections:
 Gunter Severloh's workshop (Find the WW2 & mod-specified collections)
 TabooOlive's Arma 3 World War II Collection (2017) (120+ mods)

Other military simulations 
Project Reality (2005)
Iron Front: Liberation 1944 (2012)
Day of Infamy (2017)
Fog of War (2018)
Post Scriptum (2018)
Vanguard: Normandy 1944 (2019)
Hell Let Loose (2019) (Multi-genre)
Medic: Pacific War (2023) (Multi-genre)
 Resolve (video game) (2023)

Massive multiplayer online first-person shooter (MMOFPS) 
World War II Online (2001)
Heroes & Generals (2013)
Hell Let Loose (2019) (Multi-genre)
Enlisted (2021)
WWII Online: Chokepoint (TBA)

Stealth games

The Death to Spies series 
Death to Spies (2007)
Death to Spies: Moment of Truth (2008)
Alekhine's Gun (2016)

Other stealth games 
Castle Wolfenstein (1981)
Beyond Castle Wolfenstein (1984)
Into the Eagle's Nest (1986)
The Great Escape (1986)
Escape from Colditz (1991)
Prisoner of War (2002)
The Great Escape (2003)
Airborne Troops: Countdown to D-Day (2005)
Pilot Down: Behind Enemy Lines (2005)
Velvet Assassin (2009)
The Saboteur (2009)

Construction and management simulations 
Construction simulations:

DeGenerals S.A.'s series 
Tank Mechanic Simulator (2020) (Multi-genre)
Tank Mechanic Simulator – First Supply DLC (2022)
Tank Squad (2023) (Multi-genre)
Different developers:
Tank Mechanic Simulator VR (2022) (Multi-genre)

PlayWay S.A.'s various constructors range 
Project Wunderwaffe (2022)
WW2 Rebuilder (2023)
WW2 Rebuilder: Germany Prologue (2022)

Other construction simulations 
Sprocket (2021) (Multi-genre)
Ultimate Admiral: Dreadnoughts (2021) (Multi-genre)

Management simulations:

The Warship Girls series 

 Warship Girls (2012)
 Warship Girls R (2016)

The Kantai Collection series 
Online/mobile games:
Kantai Collection (2013)
KanColle Kai (2016)
KanColle Android (2016)

Other managerial simulations 
Until the Last Plane (2021) (Multi-genre)
Aircraft Carrier Survival (2022) (Multi-genre)

Tank simulators

Loriciel and Futura's WW2 sims series 
Sherman M4 (1989) (aka. Sherman M-4)
D-Day (1992) (Multi-genre)

The Panzer Elite series 
Panzer Elite (1999)
Panzer Elite: Special Edition (2001)
Panzer Elite Action: Fields of Glory (aka. First Battalion) (2006)
Panzer Elite Action: Dunes of War (2007)

Enterbrain's Panzer Front series 
Panzer Front (2000)
Panzer Front bis. (2001) (JP-only update)
Panzer Front Ausf.B (2004)

Digital Fusion Inc.'s series 
M4: Operation Tiger Hunt (2002)
Panzer Killer! (2007)

Graviteam's various series 
Steel Fury – Kharkov 1942 (2007)
Achtung Panzer: Kharkov 1943 (2009)
Graviteam Tactics: Operation Star (2011) (aka. Achtung Panzer: Operation Star)
 4 unique content expansions (2014)
Graviteam Tactics: Mius Front (2016)
 25+ expansions (2016 to 2020's)
Tank Warfare: Tunisia 1943 (2017)
 4 DLC expansions (2017–2018)

DeGenerals S.A.'s series 
Tank Mechanic Simulator (2020) (Multi-genre)
Tank Mechanic Simulator – First Supply DLC (2022)
Tank Squad (2023) (Multi-genre)
Different developers:
Tank Mechanic Simulator VR (2022) (Multi-genre)

SP Games' WWII Tanks series 
WWII Tanks: Battlefield (2021)
Tank Commander: Battlefield (2022)
WWII Tanks: Forgotten Battles (2023)

Other tank simulators 
Sands of Fire (1989)
M4: Sherman Tank Simulator (1992)
Across the Rhine (1995) (Multi-genre)
iPanzer '44 (1998)
Panzer Commander (1998)
WWII: Tank Battles (2006)
WWII Battle Tanks: T-34 vs Tiger (2007)
World of Tanks (2009)
 War Thunder (2012) (Multi-genre)
Sprocket (2021) (Multi-genre)

Naval simulators

Digital Illusions' naval sim series 
PT-109 (video game) (1988)
PT Boat Simulator (1994) (Remake of PT-109)

Loriciel and Futura's WW2 sims series 
Advanced Destroyer Simulator (1990)
D-Day (1992) (Multi-genre)

Conflict Analytics' Action Stations! group 
Action Stations! (video game) (1990)
Action Stations! - Scenario Utility Disk (1991) (Amiga add-on)

Other naval simulators 
Destroyer (video game) (1986)
Dreadnoughts Data Disk: Bismarck (1992 Amiga add-on for Dreadnoughts (video game))
Task Force 1942 (1992) (aka. Task Force 1942: Surface Naval Action in the South Pacific. Multi-genre.)
Destroyer Command (2002)
PT Boats: Knights of the Sea (2009)
PT Boats: South Gambit (2010) (Standalone add-on of 2009 PT Boats title)
War Thunder (2012) (Multi-genre)
Victory At Sea (2014)
World of Warships (2015)
Victory At Sea Pacific (2018)
Sea of Battle (2019)
Ultimate Admiral: Dreadnoughts (2021) (Multi-genre)
Aircraft Carrier Survival (2022) (Multi-genre)
Destroyer: The U-Boat Hunter (2022)

Submarine simulators

Digital Illusions' sub sim series 
Gato (video game) (1984)
Sub Battle Simulator (1987)

MicroProse's Silent Service series 
Silent Service (1985)
Silent Service II (1990)

Deadly Games' U-Boat Macintosh series 
U-boat (video game) (1994)
U-Boat II: Drumbeat (1995)

The Silent Hunter series 
Silent Hunter (1996)
Silent Hunter Patrol Disk (1996)
Silent Hunter Patrol Disk #2 (1996)
Silent Hunter: Commander's Edition (1997)
Silent Hunter II (2001)
Silent Hunter III (2005)
Silent Hunter 4: Wolves of the Pacific (2007)
Silent Hunter 4: Wolves of the Pacific – U-Boat Missions (2008)
Silent Hunter V: Battle of the Atlantic (2010)

Other submarine simulators 
 Sub Battle Simulator (1987)
Grey Wolf: Hunter of the North Atlantic (1994)
 UBOAT (2019) (Multi-genre)
 Wolfpack (2019)

Flight simulators

MicroProse's WW2 flight sim range

Sid Meier's Ace series 
 Hellcat Ace (1982)
 Spitfire Ace (1982)

The B-17 Flying Fortress series 
B-17 Flying Fortress (video game) (1992) (First main title)
B-17 Flying Fortress: The Mighty 8th (2000) (Second main title)
B-17 Flying Fortress : The Mighty 8th Redux (TBA) (Remake)
B-17 Flying Fortress The Bloody 100th (TBA) (Third main title)
The Mighty Eighth VR (TBA)

MicroProse's other WW2 flight sim titles range 
1942: The Pacific Air War (1994)
European Air War (1998)

Lucasarts' Air Combat series 
 Battlehawks 1942 (1988)
 Their Finest Hour: The Battle of Britain (1989)
 Their Finest Missions: Volume One (1989)
 Secret Weapons of the Luftwaffe (1991)
 P-38 Lightning Tour of Duty (1991)
 P-80 Shooting Star Tour Of Dut (1991)
 He 162 Volksjäger Tour of Duty (1991)
 Do 335 Pfeil (1991)
Secret Weapons Over Normandy (2003)

The Air Warrior series 
 Air Warrior (1988)
 Air Warrior II (1997)
 Air Warrior III (1997)

Deadly Games' Bomber 3 series 
Bomber (video game) (1989) (aka. Bomber III: Flak Alley)
Bomber 3 (TBA) (Digital rerelease by MicroProse)

Sierra's Aces series 
Aces of the Pacific (1992)
Aces over Europe (1993)

Rowan Software's WW2 flight sim series 
Reach for the Skies (1993)
Overlord (1994)
Rowan's Battle of Britain (2000)
Other developers' titles:
Battle of Britain II: Wings of Victory (2005)
Air Battles: Sky Defender (2007) (Arcade remake of Rowan's Battle of Britain)

Microsoft's Combat Flight Simulator series 
 Microsoft Combat Flight Simulator (1998)
 Microsoft Combat Flight Simulator 2: WWII Pacific Theater (2000)
 Microsoft Combat Flight Simulator 3: Battle for Europe (2002)

The Warbirds series 
 Warbirds (1998)
 Warbirds II (1999)
 Warbirds III (2002)

The Aces High series 
MMO flight sims:
Aces High (2000)
Aces High II (2003)
Aces High III (2016)

InterActive Vision's WW2 flight sim series 
Beyond Pearl Harbor: Pacific Warriors (2000) (aka. Pacific Warriors: Air Combat Action)
Dogfight: Battle for the Pacific (2003) (aka. Pacific Warriors II: Dogfight)
Red Skies Over Europe (2004)
Iron Aces: Heroes of WWII (2006)
WWII Battle Over Europe (2008)

IL-2 Sturmovik  series 
 IL-2 Sturmovik (2001)
 IL-2 Sturmovik: Forgotten Battles (2003)
 IL-2 Sturmovik: Forgotten Battles – Ace Expansion Pack (2004)
Pacific Fighters (2004)
IL-2 Sturmovik: 1946 (2006)
IL-2 Sturmovik: Birds of Prey (2009)
Wings of Prey (2009)
IL-2 Sturmovik: Cliffs of Dover (2011)
IL-2 Sturmovik: Great Battles (2013)
IL-2 Sturmovik: Cliffs of Dover – Blitz Edition (2017)

MAUS Software's WW2 flight sims 
Pearl Harbor: Strike at Dawn (2001)
Battle of Europe (2005)

G5 Software's Red Shark series 
Red Shark (2002)
Red Shark 2 (2005)

City Interactive's Combat Wings series 
 World War II: Pacific Heroes (2003)
 Combat Wings (2005)
 Combat Wings: Battle of Britain (2006)
 Combat Wings: The Great Battles of WWII (2012)
 Dogfight 1942 (2012)
 Dogfight 1942: Russia Under Siege (2012) (1st DLC)
 Dogfight 1942: Fire Over Africa (2012) (2nd DLC)

Na.p.s. Team's WW2 flight sim series 
Flying Squadron (2003)
WWII: Battle Over the Pacific (2006)
Iron Wings (2017)

Ubisoft's various series 
Heroes of the Pacific (2005)
Blazing Angels: Squadrons of WWII (2006)
Blazing Angels 2: Secret Missions of WWII (2007)
Heroes over Europe (2009)

The Air Conflicts series 
 Air Conflicts: Air Battles of World War II (2006)
Attack on Pearl Harbor (2007)
Pearl Harbor Trilogy – 1941: Red Sun Rising (2010) (Remake of 2007 Attack on Pearl Harbor title)
 Air Conflicts: Aces of World War II (2009)
 Air Conflicts: Secret Wars (2011)
 Air Conflicts: Pacific Carriers (2012)

Home Net Games' Warplanes series 
Warplanes: WW2 Dogfight (2018)
Warplanes: Online Combat (2020) (Mobile)
Warplanes: Battles over Pacific (2022) (VR)

Other flight simulators 
B-17 Bomber (video game) (1982)
Ace of Aces (video game) (1986)
Hellcats Over the Pacific (1991)
D-Day (1992) (Multi-genre)
Dogfight: 80 Years of Aerial Warfare (1993) (aka. Air Duel: 80 Years of Dogfighting)
Pacific Strike (1994)
Fighter Ace (1997)
Jane's WWII Fighters (1998)
Luftwaffe Commander (1999)
Fighter Squadron: Screamin' Demons Over Europe (1999)
Iron Aces (2000)
Airfix: Dogfighter (2000)
Pearl Harbor: Zero Hour (2001)
Jane's Attack Squadron (2002)
Allied Ace Pilots (2006)
B-17: Fortress in the Sky (2007)
Digital Combat Simulator (2008)
WWII Aces (2008)
Strike Witches: Blitz in the Blue Sky – New Commander Struggles! (2009) (Alternate reality)
Airstrike Eagles of World War II (2011)
Birds of Steel (2012)
Damage Inc. Pacific Squadron WWII (2012)
War Thunder (2012) (Multi-genre)
World of Warplanes (2013)
WW2: Wings of Duty (2014)
Sky Gamblers: Storm Raiders (2015)
Flying Tigers: Shadows Over China (2017)
Iron Wings (2017)
Kamikazes: Battle of the Philippine Sea (2017)
Wings of Steel (2018) (Mobile)
War Dogs : Air Combat Flight S (2019) (Mobile)

Multi-type simulators

Lesta Studio's Pacific Storm series 
Pacific Storm (2005) (Multi-genre)
Pacific Storm: Allies (2007) (Multi-genre)
Pacific Storm Pack (2009) (Compilation of 2 unique P.S. titles)

Eidos' Battlestations series 
 Battlestations: Midway (2007)
Battlestations: Midway - Iowa Mission Pack (2007) (DLC)
 Battlestations: Pacific (2009)
 3 content DLC packs (2009)

Sierra's Aces series 
 Aces of the Pacific (1992)
 Aces of the Pacific: Expansion Disk – WWII: 1946 (1992)
 Aces Over Europe (1993)
 Aces of the Deep (1994)
 Aces of the Deep: Expansion Disk (1995)
 Command: Aces of the Deep (1995)

Other multi-type simulators 

 War Thunder (2012) (Multi-genre)
 War on the Sea (2021)

Role-playing games 
Another War (2002)
GROM: ...Terror in Tibet! (2003)
Weird War (2004)
Combat Elite: WWII Paratroopers (2005)
Strike Witches: Kiseki no Rondo (2015)

Tactical role-playing games 
Operation Darkness (2007)

The Valkyria Chronicles series 
Valkyria Chronicles (2008)
Valkyria Chronicles II (2010)
Valkyria Chronicles III (2011)
Valkyria Chronicles 4 (2018)

CyberConnect2's Fuga series 
Anthropomorphic, anime-ish stories based on World War 2
Fuga: Melodies of Steel (2021)
Fuga: Melodies of Steel 2 (2023)

Other tactical role-playing games 
WARSAW (2019)
Broken Lines (video game) (2020) (Alternate history)
Burden of Command (TBA)

Real-time tactics games

Great Naval Battles Games 
 Great Naval Battles: North Atlantic 1939–1943 (1992)
 Great Naval Battles: North Atlantic 1939–1943 – Super Ships of the Atlantic (1993)
 Great Naval Battles: North Atlantic 1939–1943 – America in the Atlantic (1993)
 Great Naval Battles: North Atlantic 1939–1943 – Scenario Builder (1993)
 Great Naval Battles Vol. II: Guadalcanal 1942–43 (1994)
 Great Naval Battles Vol. III: Fury in the Pacific, 1941–1944 (1995)
 Great Naval Battles Vol. IV: Burning Steel, 1939–1942 (1995)
 The Complete Great Naval Battles: The Final Fury (Incl. Great Naval Battles Vol. V: Demise of the Dreadnoughts 1914–18) (1996)

The Close Combat series 
Close Combat (1996)
Close Combat: A Bridge Too Far (1997)
Close Combat: Last Stand Arnhem (2010) (Remake based on CC 2 (1997) & CC: The Longest Day (2009))
Close Combat III: The Russian Front (1998)
Close Combat: Cross of Iron (2007) (Remake of CC 3)
Close Combat IV: Battle of the Bulge (1999)
Close Combat: Wacht am Rhein (2008) (Remake of CC 4)
Close Combat: Invasion: Normandy (2000)
Close Combat: The Longest Day (2009) (Remake of CC 5 (2000))
Close Combat: Panthers in the Fog (2012)
Close Combat: Gateway to Caen (2014)
Close Combat: The Bloody First (2019)

The Sudden Strike series 
Counter Action (1997)
Protivostoyanie: Opalyonnyj sneg (1998)
Sudden Strike (2000)
Sudden Strike Forever (2001) (expansion pack)
Protivostoyanie 3: Vtoroe dyhanie (2002)
Sudden Strike 2 (2002)
Hidden Stroke: APRM (2003) (unofficial expansion)
Sudden Strike: Resource War (2004) (stand-alone expansion)
Hidden Stroke 2: APRM (2005) (stand-alone expansion)
Sudden Strike 3: Arms for Victory (2007)
Sudden Strike: The Last Stand (2010) (stand-alone expansion)
 Sudden Strike 4 (2017)

The Commandos series 
 Commandos: Behind Enemy Lines (1998)
 Commandos: Beyond the Call of Duty (1999)
 Commandos 2: Men of Courage (2001)
 Commandos 2 – HD Remaster (2020)
 Commandos 3: Destination Berlin (2003)
 Commandos 3 - HD Remaster (2022)

Panther Games' Command Ops series 
Airborne Assault: Red Devils Over Arnhem (2002)
Airborne Assault: Highway to the Reich (2003)
Airborne Assault: Conquest of the Aegean (2006)
Command Ops: Battles from the Bulge (2010)
Command Ops: Highway to the Reich (2012) (Expansion with content from 1st 2 AA titles)
Command Ops: Battles for Greece (2013) (Expansion)
Command Ops 2 (2015)
7 volume expansions (2015)

The Squad Assault series 
G.I. Combat: Episode 1 – Battle of Normandy (2002)
Eric Young's Squad Assault: West Front (2003)
Squad Assault: Second Wave (2005)

The Blitzkrieg series 
Blitzkrieg (2003)
Blitzkrieg: Burning Horizon (expansion pack) (2004)
Blitzkrieg: Rolling Thunder (expansion pack) (2004)
Blitzkrieg: Green Devils (expansion pack) (2005)
Blitzkrieg: Iron Division (Blitzkrieg Anthology exclusive expansion pack) (2005)
Blitzkrieg 2 (2005)
 Blitzkrieg 2: Fall of the Reich (2006) (Expansion)
 Blitzkrieg 2: Liberation (2007) (Expansion)
Blitzkrieg 3 (2015)

The Afrika Korps series 
Used Digital Reality Software's Walker 2 engine.
 Desert Rats vs. Afrika Korps (aka. Afrika Korps vs. Desert Rats) (2004)
 D-Day (2004)
1944: Battle of the Bulge (aka. No Surrender: Battle of the Bulge) (2005)
 Moscow to Berlin: Red Siege (aka. Mockba to Berlin) (2006)

InterActive Vision's Chain of Command series 
Chain of Command (2004) (aka. To Serve and Command)
Chain Of Command: Eastern Front (2005)

The Codename: Panzers series 
 Codename: Panzers Phase One (2004)
 Codename: Panzers Phase Two (2005)
 Rush For Berlin (2006)
 Rush For the Bomb (2007) (Expansion)

The Men of War series 
Soldiers: Heroes of World War II (2004)
Silent Heroes: Elite Troops of WWII (2005)
Faces of War (2006)
V tylu vraga: Diversanty 2 (2006)
V tylu vraga 2. Bratya po oruzhiyu (2007)
V tylu vraga: Diversanty 3 (2008)
Men of War (2008)
Men of War: Red Tide (2009)
Men of War: Assault Squad (2011)
Men of War: Condemned Heroes (2012)
Men of War: Assault Squad 2 (2014)
Assault Squad 2: Men of War Origins (2016)
Soldiers: Arena (2019) (aka. Men of War II: Arena. Cancelled in 2021.)
Men of War II (2023)

The Company of Heroes series 
Company of Heroes (2006)
Company of Heroes: Opposing Fronts (2007)
Company of Heroes: Tales of Valor (2009)
Company of Heroes 2 (2013)
Company of Heroes 2: Ardennes Assault (2014)
Company of Heroes 3 (2023)

1C's Theatre of War series 
Theatre Of War (2007)
Theatre of War 2: Africa 1943 (2009)
Theatre of War 2: Centauro (2009) (Expansion)
Theatre of War 2: Kursk 1943 (2010)
Theatre of War 2 – Battle for Caen (2010) (Expansion)

Digitalmindsoft's Gates of Hell series 
Spiritual successor to the Men of War series:
Call to Arms – Gates of Hell: Ostfront (2021) (Expansion to Call to Arms (2018))
Call to Arms – Gates of Hell: Talvisota (2022) (1st DLC expansion)
Call to Arms – Gates of Hell: Scorched Earth (TBA) (2nd DLC expansion)

Other real-time tactics games 
D-Day (1992) (Multi-genre)
Offensive (1996)
Muzzle Velocity (1997)
Fortress Europe: The Liberation of France (2001)
WarCommander (2001)
World War II: Panzer Claws (aka. Frontline Attack: War Over Europe) (2002)
World War II: Frontline Command (2003)
Panzer Claws II (2004)
Great Battles of WWII: Stalingrad (2004)
Super Army (2005)
Frontline: Fields of Thunder (2007)
Panzer Tactics DS (2007)
Talvisota: Icy Hell (2007)
World War II: General Commander (2008) (2009 digital release by Matrix Games)
Order Of War (2009)
Achtung Panzer Operation Star (2011)
Uprising 44: The Silent Shadows (2012) (Multi-genre)
Partisans 1941 (2020)
AB 1943 mod (2021) (For Armored Brigade (2018))

Real-time strategy games

MicroProse's Command Series 
Crusade in Europe (video game) (1985) (aka. Crusade in Europe: The Strategic War Simulation)
Decision in the Desert (1985)

The Command & Conquer: Red Alert series 
Command & Conquer: Red Alert (1996)
Command & Conquer: Red Alert – Counterstrike (1997)
Command & Conquer: Red Alert – The Aftermath (1997)
Command & Conquer: Red Alert – Retaliation (1998)
Command & Conquer Remastered Collection (2020)

The Empire Earth series 
 Empire Earth (video game) (2001)
 Empire Earth: The Art of Conquest (2001)
 Empire Earth II (2005)
 Empire Earth II: The Art of Supremacy (2006)
 Empire Earth III (2007)

Lesta Studio's WWII titles range 
Pacific Storm (2005) (Multi-genre)
Pacific Storm: Allies (2007) (Multi-genre)
Aggression - Reign over Europe (2008)
Cannon Strike (2009) (More real-time tactics than RTS)
Pacific Storm Pack (2009) (Compilation of 2 unique P.S. titles)

The Steel Division series 
Steel Division: Normandy 44 (2017)
2 Division Pack expansions (2017–2018)
Steel Division 2 (2019)
26 unique content expansions (2019–2022)

The Military Operations series 
Military Operations: Benchmark (2018)
Military Operations (TBA) (Shorthand: MilOps)

Other real-time strategy games 
Conqueror (1988)
P.T.O. (1989)
Across the Rhine (1995) (Multi-genre)
Empires: Dawn of the Modern World (2003)
Rise of Nations (2003)
War Times (2004)
Axis & Allies (2004)
War Front: Turning Point (2007)
Officers (2007)
Spring: 1944 (2008) (Open-source)
World War II Online: Battleground Europe (High Command) (2009)
War Leaders: Clash of Nations (2009)
R.U.S.E. (2010)
DomiNations (2015)
Radio General (2020)
Call of War (2017)
Attack at Dawn: North Africa (2022) (Multi-genre)
WWII Online: Chokepoint (TBA)

Turn-based strategy games

SSI's WW2 TBS series 
See List of Strategic Simulations games.
Computer Bismarck (1980)
Fighter Command: Battle of Britain (1983)
50 Mission Crush (1984)

Gary Grigsby's TBS series 
Grigsby's titles published by SSI. Check tagged name's page for list.
 25 titles (1982-1997)

SSG's Carriers at War series 
Carriers at War 1941–1945: Fleet Carrier Operations in the Pacific (1984)
Carriers at War (1992 video game) (DOS Remake)
Carriers at War: Construction Kit (1993) (Expansion)
Carriers at War II (1993)
The Complete Carriers at War (1996) (Compilation of prior & new content)
Carriers at War (2007) (Second remake with Matrix Games)

Gary Grigsby's air combat wargame series 
U.S.A.A.F. - United States Army Air Force (1985)
Battle of Britain (1999) (Turn-based strategy)
Talonsoft's 12 O'Clock High: Bombing the Reich (1999)
Gary Grigsby's Eagle Day to Bombing the Reich (2009) (Remake of BoB (1999) & 12 O'Clock High (1999))

SSG's various series 
Battlefront's (1986) engine:
Battlefront (1986 video game)
Battles in Normandy (1987)
Rommel: Battles for North Africa (1988)
Panzer Battles (1989)

Decisive Battles of WWII series:
 Decisive Battles of WWII: Ardennes Offensive (1997)
 Decisive Battles of WWII Vol 2: Korsun Pocket (2003)
 Decisive Battles of WWII: Across the Dnepr (2003) (Expansion)
 Decisive Battles of World War II: Battles in Normandy (2004)
 Decisive Battles of World War II: Battles in Italy (2005)
Battlefront (2007 video game) (2007) (Namesake of 1986 version)
Kharkov: Disaster on the Donets (2008)
Across the Dnepr: Second Edition (2010) (Expansion. Remake of 2003 namesake title.)

Atomic Games' various series

V for Victory series 
V for Victory: Battleset 1 - D-Day Utah Beach - 1944 (1991)
V for Victory: Velikiye Luki (1992)
V for Victory: Market Garden (1993)
V for Victory: Victory Pak (1993) (Pack of 1st 3 unique V for Victory titles)
V for Victory: Gold-Juno-Sword (1993)
V for Victory: Commemorative Collection (1995) (Pack of all 4 unique V for Victory titles)

World at War series 
A continuation of the V for Victory series:
Operation Crusader (video game) (1994)
World at War: Stalingrad (1994)
D-Day: America Invades (1995)

The Koutetsu no Kishi series 
Koutetsu no Kishi (1991)
Koutetsu no Kishi 2: Sabaku no Rommel Shougun (1994)
Koutetsu no Kishi 3: Gekitotsu Europe Sensen (1995)

HPS Simulations' various series 
Tigers on the Prowl (1994)
Panthers in the Shadows (1995)
Tigers on the Prowl 2 (1996)

The Panzer General series 
Panzer General (1994)
Allied General (1995)
Pacific General (1997)
Panzer General II (1997)
Panzer General 3D Assault (1999)
Panzer General III: Scorched Earth (2000)
Panzer General Online (2013)
Open General (2009)

The Steel Panthers series 
 Steel Panthers (1995)
 Steel Panthers: Campaign Disk (1996)
 Steel Panthers: Campaign Disk #2 (1997)
 Steel Panthers II: Modern Battles (1996)
 Steel Panthers II: Modern Battles – Campaign Disk (1996)
 SPWW2 (stand-alone expansion) (1999)
 Steel Panthers III: Brigade Command – 1939–1999 (1997)
 Steel Panthers: World at War (2000)

Big Time Software's Over the Reich series 
Over the Reich (1996)
Achtung Spitfire! (1997)

Talonsoft's various series

Talonsoft's Campaign series 
 East Front (1997)
 East Front: Campaign CD 1 (1998)
 West Front (1998)
 West Front: Operation Sea Lion (1999)
 West Front: Battle Pack 1 (1999)
 TalonSoft's West Front: Elite Edition (2000) (Compilation of West Front & WF: Battle Pack 1)
 East Front 2 (1999)
 Campaign Series: Europe in Flames (2000) (Partial compilation of some prior series titles)
 East Front 2: Fall of the Reich (2001)
 Rising Sun (2000)
 Rising Sun: Imperial Strike (2000)
 TalonSoft's Rising Sun: Gold (2000)
 TalonSoft's World at War (2001) (Compilation of some prior bundles)
 John Tiller's Campaign Series (2007) (Compilation of prior series titles published by Matrix Games)

The Operational Art of War series 
Early series titles between 1998-2000 published by Talonsoft. TOAW III (2006) was the last Talonsoft-developed series title.
Norm Koger's The Operational Art of War Vol 1: 1939–1955 (1998)
Norm Koger's The Operational Art of War Vol 1: 1939-1955 - Battle Pack I Scenario Add-on Disk (1999)
The Operational Art of War: Century of Warfare (2000) (Collection of 1st 2 TOAW full games & expansions)
The Operational Art of War Vol 1: 1939-1955 - Elite★Edition (2000) (Compilation of 1st full TOAW game & expansion)
The Operational Art of War Vol 1: 1939-1955 - Wargame of the Year Edition (2000) (Similar to Elite★Edition (2000) but with added scenarios)
Norm Koger's The Operational Art of War III (2006) (First series title to be released by a different publisher, Matrix Games)
The Operational Art of War IV (2017)

The Battle of Asia in World War II series 
Battle of Asia in World War II (1999)
Battle of Asia in World War II: The Formosan connection (2004)
Battle of Asia in World War II: The Great Raid (2008)
Battle of Asia in World War II: Destination Tokyo (2012)

JTS/WDS' various series 
(John Tiller Software/Wargame Design Studio's various series)
Panzer Campaigns series
 26 episodes (1999–2021)
Naval Campaigns series
 4 episodes (2003–2022) (Guadalcanal & Midway were 1st published by HPS Simulations.)
Strategic War series
Total War in Europe: First Blitzkrieg (2005) (1st published by HPS Simulations. aka. Strategic War: The First Blitzkrieg.)
Total War in Europe: War on the Southern Front (2009) (1st published by HPS Simulations. aka. Strategic War: War on the Southern Front.)
Panzer Battles series
 4 episodes (2016–2018)
Squad Battles series
 6 episodes (2002–2010. 6 early WW2 episodes in series were 1st published by HPS Simulations.)

Boku Strategy Games' Combat Command series 
Combat Command 2: Danger Forward (2000)
Combat Command 2: Desert Rats! (2001)
Combat Command: The Matrix Edition (2011) (Updated compilation of prior 2 titles)

The Combat Mission series 
Combat Mission: Beyond Overlord (2000)
Combat Mission: Barbarossa to Berlin (2002)
Combat Mission Afrika Korps (2004)

The Strategic Command series 
 Strategic Command: European Theater (2002)
 Strategic Command: Gold (2006)
 Strategic Command 2: Blitzkrieg (2006)
 Strategic Command 2: Weapons and Warfare Expansion (2007)
 Strategic Command 2: Patton Drives East (2008)
Strategic Command: WWII Pacific Theater (2008)
Strategic Command: WWII Global Conflict (2010)
Strategic Command: WWII Global Conflict – Gold (2011)
 Strategic Command: WWII – War in Europe (2017)

IgorLab Software's Soldiers of Empires series 
Soldiers of Empires (2002)
Soldiers of Empires 2 (2012) (Cancelled. Only demo was released.)

VR Designs' various series 
Advanced Tactics: World War II (2007)
Decisive Campaigns: The Blitzkrieg from Warsaw to Paris (2010)
Advanced Tactics: Gold (2011)
Decisive Campaigns: Case Blue (2012)
Decisive Campaigns: Barbarossa (2015)
Decisive Campaigns: Ardennes Offensive (2021)

Slitherine's Battle Academy series 
Battle Academy (2010)
 6 expansions (2010–2013)
Battle Academy 2: Eastern Front (2014)
Battle Academy 2 – Battle of Kursk (2015) (Expansion)

The Unity of Command series 
Unity of Command (video game) (2011)
2 DLC expansions (2012–2013)
Unity of Command II (2019)
5 content expansions (2020–2022)

The Panzer Corps series 
Panzer Corps: Wehrmacht (2011) (Remake of Panzer General)
17 unique expansions (2011–2016)
Panzer Corps: Gold Edition (2016)
Panzer Corps 2 (2020)
7 expansions (2020–2022)

Brian Kelly's WEGO series 
Desert War 1940-43 (2011) (Freeware online Java-based version. Shut down in 2016.)
WEGO World War II: Desert War (2018) (Old name: Desert War 1940-1942)
WEGO World War II: Stalingrad (2021)

The Order of Battle series 
Order of Battle: Pacific (2015)
Order of Battle: World War II (2015, GOG. 2016, Steam) (Free re-release of OoB: Pacific with only a boot camp campaign)
17 DLC expansions (2016–2021)

Yobowargames' Battle Series 
Battle Series: Eastern Front – Operation Typhoon (2016) (aka. Moscow '41 on itch.io)
Operation Fall Gelb – The Battle for France (2016) (Mobile only)
Battle Series: Kursk – Battle at Prochorovka (2017)
Battle Series: Eastern Front – Battle for Korsun (2018)
Battle Series Pacific: Battle for Iwo Jima (2020)
Battle Series: Eastern Front – KRIM: The War in the Crimea 1941–42 (2020)

Starni Games' various series 
Panzer Strategy (2018)

The Strategic Mind series 
Strategic Mind: The Pacific (2019)
Strategic Mind: Blitzkrieg (2020)
Strategic Mind: Spectre of Communism (2020)
Strategic Mind: Fight for Freedom (2021)
Strategic Mind: Spirit of Liberty (2022)

The WarPlan series 
WarPlan (Kraken Studios and Matrix Games) (2019)
WarPlan Pacific (Kraken Studios and Matrix Games) (2021)

Strategy Game Studio's series 
 6 episodes (2020's) (Based on actual, not fictional, scenarios)

=== Primarily mobile series: ===

Handygames' WWII mobile strategy games 
 1942: Deadly Desert (2004, reissued in 2016)
 1941: Frozen Front (2005, reissued in 2013)

The Frontline: Games Series (Mobile) 
Frontline: Eastern Front (2019. Mobile only.)
Frontline: Western Front (2019)
Frontline: The Great Patriotic War	(2019)
Frontline: Panzer Blitzkrieg! (2020)
Frontline: World War II (2021)

88 mm Games' series 
Also as Shenandoah Studios. Same staff as the Frontline: Games Series firm.
Battle of the Bulge (2012)
Drive on Moscow: War in the Snow (2013)
Frontline: Road to Moscow (2014)
Frontline: The Longest Day (2014)

Other turn-based strategy games 
Pacific War (1984) (ZX Spectrum)
Europe Ablaze (1985) (aka. Europe Ablaze: The Air War Over England and Germany 1939–1945)
Pearl Harbour (1985)
Fire-Brigade: The Battle for Kiev – 1943 (1988)
Air Raid Pearl Harbor (1990)
Barbarossa (1992)
Task Force 1942 (1992) (aka. Task Force 1942: Surface Naval Action in the South Pacific. Multi-genre.)
The Battle of Britain 2 (1992) (aka. the Battle of Britain)
Grandest Fleet (1994)
T-34: The Battle (Polish Atari 8-bit game)
Sgt. Saunders' Combat! (1995)
Battleground: Ardennes (1995)
Daisenryaku (Iron Storm) (1996)
G.I. Combat: Episode 1 – Battle of Normandy (2002)
Pacific War: Matrix Edition (2003)
War in the Pacific: The Struggle Against Japan 1941–1945 (2004)
For King and Country: Operation Victory (2005)
War Plan Orange: Dreadnoughts in the Pacific 1922–1930 (2005)
Air Campaigns of WWII: Defending the Reich (2006)
World War II – Road to Victory (2008)
Military History Commander Europe at War (2009)
War in the Pacific: Admiral's Edition (2009)
Legends of War (2011)
Pacific Fleet (2014)
Spymaster (2014. Mobile.)
Atlantic Fleet (2015)
Red Thunder (2016) (By digital Gameworks. Discontinued in 2018.)
Hex of Steel (2020)
Through the Darkest of Times (2020)
Attack at Dawn: North Africa (2022) (Multi-genre)

Turn-based tactics games

Microcomputer Games Inc.'s WW2 TBT series 
Division of Avalon Hill. See List of Avalon Hill games.
Under Fire! (1985) (aka. Under Fire!: A Simulation of Squad Level Combat in WWII.)

General Quarters Software's tactical naval wargame series 
Battleship Bismarck: Operation Rhine - May 1941 (1987)
Midway: The Battle that Doomed Japan (1989)
Action in The North Atlantic (1989)
Air Raid Pearl Harbor (1990)
The Great Marianas Turkey Shoot (1990)

Random Games' 1996-2000 Strategy Engine 
Soldiers at War (1998)
Avalon Hill's Squad Leader (2000)

The Silent Storm series 
Silent Storm (2003)
Silent Storm: Sentinels (2004)
Hammer & Sickle (2005)

The Panzer Command series 
Panzer Command: Operation Winter Storm (2006)
Panzer Command: Kharkov (2008)
Panzer Command: Ostfront (2013)

digital Gameworks' range 
Valkyrie: Crisis in Berlin 1944 (2016) (aka. 'Valkyrie'. Web/mobile app.)
Peleliu: The Devil's Island (2019)
Monuments Men: Ebensburg (2020) (Also turn-based RPG, but not much RPG)
Murphy's Heroes Hurtgen Forest (2020)

The Armoured Commander series 
Armoured Commander (2017)
Armoured Commander II (2021)

Other turn-based tactics games 
The Troop (2021, EA)
Second Front (2022)
Headquarters World War II (TBA)
Forgotten but Unbroken (TBA)

Grand strategy games

KOEI's World War series 
P.T.O Pacific Theater of Operations (1989)
Operation Europe: Path To Victory (1991)
P.T.O Pacific Theater of Operations II (1993)
Teitoku no Ketsudan III (1996) (Japanese-only. EN: The Admiral's Decision III.)
P.T.O.: Pacific Theater of Operations IV (2001)

The Civilization series 
Civilization (1991)
Civilization II (1996)
Civilization III (2001)
Civilization IV (2005)
Civilization V (2010)
Civilization VI (2016)

The Hearts of Iron series 
Hearts of Iron (2002)
Hearts of Iron II (2005)
Hearts of Iron II: Doomsday (expansion pack) (2006)
Hearts of Iron II: Armageddon (expansion pack) (2007)
Hearts of Iron II: Iron Cross (expansion pack) (2010)
Arsenal of Democracy (2010)
Darkest Hour: A Hearts of Iron Game (Stand-alone expansion pack) (2011)
Hearts of Iron III (2009)
Hearts of Iron III: Semper Fi (expansion pack) (2010)
Hearts of Iron III: For the Motherland (expansion pack) (2011)
Hearts of Iron III: Their Finest Hour (expansion pack) (2012)
Hearts of Iron IV (2016)
 8+ major expansions & country pack DLCs (2016 to 2020's)

The Making History series 
 Making History: The Calm & The Storm (2007)
 Making History: The Calm & The Storm – Gold Edition (2008)
 Making History II: The War of the World (2010)
 Making History: The Second World War (2017)

The World Conqueror series 
World Conqueror 1945 (2011)
World Conqueror 2 (2012)
World Conqueror 3 (2015)
World Conqueror 4 (2017)

Maestro Cinetik's Cauldrons of War series 
Cauldrons of War – Barbarossa (2020)
Cauldrons of War – Stalingrad (2021)

Other grand strategy games 
Risk II (2000)
Gary Grisby's World at War (2005)
Commander: Europe at War (2007)
Commander: Pacific at War (2008)
Call of War (2009) (aka. Call of War: World War 2. Downloadable Steam version in 2017.)
Supreme Ruler 1936 (2014)

Massive Multiplayer Online Tactical Strategy Game (MMOTSG) 
NavyField (2005)
Blitz 1941 (2009)
Foxhole (video game) (2017) (Multi-genre)

Digital board games

Command Simulations' board game conversion series 
Blitzkrieg at the Ardennes (1989)
White Death (video game) (1989)

The Avalon Hill Game Company's Third Reich series 
Third Reich (1992) (aka. Computer Third Reich)
Third Reich (1996) (DOS version)

The Axis & Allies series 
Axis and Allies (1994) (CD-i version)
Axis & Allies (1998 video game) (turn-based strategy) (1998)
Axis & Allies: Iron Blitz (1999) (Updated edition)
TripleA (2011) (Open-source game engine)
Axis & Allies 1942 Online (2021)

The Conflict of Heroes series 
Conflict of Heroes: Awakening the Bear (2012)
Conflict of Heroes: Ghost Divisions (2013) (1st expansion)
Conflict of Heroes: Storms of Steel (2013) (2nd expansion)

Lock 'n Load Publishing's various series 
Mark H. Walker's Lock 'n Load: Heroes of Stalingrad (2014)
Lock 'n Load Tactical Digital: Core Game (2020)
 15+ DLC expansions (2020 to 2020's)
Tank On Tank Digital - West Front (2017)
Tank On Tank Digital - East Front Battlepack 1 (2017) (Expansion)
Nations At War Digital Core Game (2020)
 6 DLC expansions (2020 to 2020's)

Strategiae's Wars Across The World series 
Wars Across The World (2017)
 Several expansions (2017 to 2020's)

Yobowargames' Valor & Victory series 
Valor & Victory (2021)
Valor & Victory: Stalingrad (2022) (1st DLC expansion)
Valor & Victory: Shield of Cholm (2022) (2nd DLC expansion)
Valor & Victory: Arnhem (2022) (3rd DLC expansion)

Other digital board games 
World War II: TCG (2014)
Kards: The WWII Card Game (2019)

References

See also 
 List of video games
 Video game genres

World War II video games
 
Video games